Moroto is a town in Moroto District in the Northern Region of Uganda. It is the location of the district headquarters.

Location

The geographical coordinates of Moroto Town are 2°31'48.0"N, 34°40'12.0"E (Latitude:2.5300; Longitude:34.6700).

Population
The 2002 national census estimated the population of Moroto at 7,380. In 2010, the Uganda Bureau of Statistics (UBOS) estimated the population at 11,600. In 2011, UBOS estimated the mid-year population at 12,300.

In 2014, the national population census put the population of Moroto at 14,196. In 2020, UBOS estimated the mid-year population of the town at 16,300 people. The population agency calculated that the population of Moroto Town grew at an average annual rate of 2.39 percent between 2014 and 2020.

Transport
From the Moroto bus station, there are direct bus services to Kampala, Soroti, Mbale, Nakapiripirit, and other places in Uganda. The main road to Moroto is the Soroti-Moroto Road, which, as of January 2020, is fully paved. The Moroto–Nakapiripirit Road is fully paved as well.

Points of interest
(8) the headquarters of the Roman Catholic Diocese of Moroto, headed by Bishop Damiano Giulio Guzzetti.

See also
 Karamoja sub-region
 List of cities and towns in Uganda

References

External links
Unwinding From Moroto Town

Populated places in Northern Region, Uganda
Karamoja
Moroto District